The list of Harvard University politicians includes notable politicians affiliated with Harvard University.

Heads of state

Heads of government

US cabinet secretaries

US state governors

US senators

US representatives

Other political figures

See also
 List of Harvard University non-graduate alumni
 List of companies founded by Harvard University alumni

References

Lists of people by university or college in Massachusetts
People